Khan Khel (خان خیل) is a sub-tribe of the Yusufzai Pashtun tribe.

Notable People

 Faisal Javed Khan, Pakistani politician and a Member of the Senate of Pakistan

References 

Yusufzai Pashtun tribes